Little Otter may refer to:

Little Otter, West Virginia
Little Otter River (Canada)
Little Otter River (Virginia)
Little Otter Creek